Estonia–Finland relations are foreign relations between Finland and Estonia. The independent Republic of Finland, established in 1917, and the independent Republic of Estonia, established in 1918, established diplomatic relations and formally recognised each other in 1920. Diplomatic relations between the two countries were interrupted during World War II and officially restored on 29 August 1991.  Finland has an embassy in Tallinn and an honorary consulate in Tartu.  Estonia has an embassy in Helsinki and five honorary consulates, located in Oulu, Turku, Ekenäs, Tampere and Kotka.
Both countries are full members of the Council of the Baltic Sea States, European Union and the Eurozone.
Finland has given full support to Estonia's membership of the European Union. Estonia strongly supports Finland's NATO membership.
The majority languages in both countries are Finnic languages, as Finland's main language, Finnish, is related to Estonian, and there is and has been a certain feeling of kinship.  76% of Finns have visited Estonia, and in 2004, 1.8 million Finns reported visiting Estonia. The excise tax on alcohol is lower in Estonia than in Finland, thus it is common to buy large volumes of alcohol when returning from Estonia: a study in 2014 indicated that 34% of alcohol sold in Estonia is bought by Finns. Finnish and Swedish investors are the largest foreign investors in Estonia. Both Finland and Estonia are members of the European Union, Schengen agreement and the Eurozone, freeing international travel and trade between the countries. Finland is Estonia's top import partner, accounting for over 15% total import value in 2012, as well as the second-greatest market for Estonia's exports after Sweden.
Finland's government recognised Estonia's independence in 1920. In response to the Soviet invasion, diplomatic missions were de facto removed. However, when Estonia restored its independence, this "temporary obstruction" was resolved. During the restoration of Estonia's independence, Finland secretly contributed with significant economic aid and know-how under the cover of "cultural co-operation" in order to not upset the Soviet Union. Finland continues to contribute militarily, such as officers' training, and the provision of equipment.

History

Unification proposals
In Finland, the idea of a unified Greater Finland gained popularity and influence rapidly in 1917, but lost support after World War II and the Continuation War.

In 1917, 1918 and 1940, the Estonian president Konstantin Päts wished for a union of Finnic countries in his political testament, writing an outline of a unification plan. He used the term "soomesugu" in Estonian to point to the people and countries of Finland and Estonia when talking about common border law.

Anthem
The Finnish anthem Maamme and the similarly themed Estonian anthem Mu isamaa, mu õnn ja rõõm (My Fatherland, My Happiness and Joy, 1869) share the same melody.

This song is also considered to be the ethnic anthem of Livonians, titled Min izāmō, min sindimō (My Fatherland, My Native Land).

Regional cooperation
Finnish and Swedish investors are the largest foreign investors in Estonia. Both Finland and Estonia are members of the European Union, Schengen agreement and the Eurozone. Finland is Estonia's top import partner, accounting for over 15% total import value in 2012, as well as the second-greatest market for Estonia's exports after Sweden.

Finland's government recognised Estonia's independence in 1920. Finland contributed and continues to contribute military aid to Estonia, such as officers' training, and the provision of equipment.

Country comparison

Diplomacy

Republic of Estonia
Helsinki (Embassy)

Republic of Finland
Tallinn (Embassy)

See also
Foreign relations of Estonia
Foreign relations of Finland
Finnish–Estonian defence cooperation
Finnish Infantry Regiment 200
Estonians in Finland
Estonian–Finnish federation
Finland–NATO relations
Accession of Estonia to the European Union

References

External links
  Finnish Ministry of Foreign Affairs about relations with Estonia

 
Bilateral relations of Finland 
Finland